André Ivan Biyogo Poko (born 7 March 1993) is a Gabonese professional footballer who plays as a midfielder for Saudi Arabian club Al-Khaleej and the Gabon national team. He was part of the Gabon national team in the 2021 AFCON tournament in Cameroon.

Career
On 31 August 2011, Biyogo Poko joined the French Ligue 1 outfit Bordeaux on a three-year contract.

On 28 July 2022, Poko joined Saudi Professional League club Al-Khaleej on a one-year contract.

He represented his country at the 2012 African Cup of Nations, during which Gabon, as hosts of the competition, reached the quarter-finals.

Career statistics
Scores and results list Gabon's goal tally first, score column indicates score after each Biyogo Poko goal.

Honours
Bordeaux
Coupe de France: 2012–13

References

External links
 
 
 

1993 births
Living people
People from Woleu-Ntem Province
Association football midfielders
Gabonese footballers
US Bitam players
FC Girondins de Bordeaux players
Kardemir Karabükspor footballers
Göztepe S.K. footballers
Altay S.K. footballers
Khaleej FC players
Gabon international footballers
Ligue 1 players
Championnat National 2 players
Süper Lig players
TFF First League players
Saudi Professional League players
2011 CAF U-23 Championship players
2012 Africa Cup of Nations players
2015 Africa Cup of Nations players
2017 Africa Cup of Nations players
2021 Africa Cup of Nations players
Expatriate footballers in France
Expatriate footballers in Turkey
Expatriate footballers in Saudi Arabia
Gabonese expatriate footballers
Gabonese expatriate sportspeople in France
Gabonese expatriate sportspeople in Turkey
Gabonese expatriate sportspeople in Saudi Arabia
21st-century Gabonese people
2011 African Nations Championship players
Gabon A' international footballers